Crosseola cancellata is a species of small sea snail or micromollusc, a marine gastropod mollusc in the family Conradiidae.

Description
(Original description by Tenison-Woods) The diameter of this minute, white shell scarcely attains 1.5 mm. The shining, turbinated shell contains three whorls which are beautifully cancellated by close spiral ribs and distinct oblique striae. The apex is smooth. The aperture is circular and conspicuously  channelled above and below. Behind the inner lip there is a narrow groove forming a false umbilicus, then a rounded spiral rib, and then a broad regularly striate groove on the base.

Distribution
This marine species is endemic to Australia. It occurs off South Australia, Tasmania and Victoria

References

 Tenison-Woods, J.E. 1879. On some new Tasmanian marine shells. Proceedings of the Royal Society of Tasmania 1877: 121-123
 Cotton, B.C. 1959. South Australian Mollusca. Archaeogastropoda. Handbook of the Flora and Fauna of South Australia. Adelaide : South Australian Government Printer 449 pp.
 Rubio F. & Rolán E. (2017). New species of Crosseolidae Hickman, 2013 (Gastropoda) from the Tropical Indo-Pacific. Novapex. 18(1-2): 17-34

External links
 To World Register of Marine Species

cancellata
Gastropods described in 1878